Ramin Ganeshram (born June 21, 1968) is an American journalist, food writer, and novelist. She is known for her work in polycultural American history and historic foodways.

Early life and education
Ganeshram was born in New York City to a Trinidadian father and an Iranian mother. She attended Stuyvesant High School of Science and earned a master's degree in journalism from Columbia University, both in Manhattan. Later she trained at the Institute of Culinary Education also in New York City, where she has also worked as a chef instructor.

In 2019, Ganeshram was named a Paul Cuffe Memorial Fellow, For the Study of Minorities in Maritime History at Mystic Seaport, in Mystic, Connecticut.

Journalism career
In addition to contributing to a variety of major food publications, Ganeshram is the author of several cookbooks. She was as a reporter and writer on Molly O'Neill's magnum One Big Table (Simon & Schuster 2010).

Ganeshram has received multiple journalism awards, an International Association of Culinary Professionals' Bert Greene culinary journalism nomination and Cookbook of the Year Award.

In January 2010, she founded the charity Food 4 Haiti, to raise money for the UN World Food Programme's effort in the earthquake ravaged Haiti.

Ganeshram's first work of fiction Stir It Up! focuses on a teen chef who gets a shot at cooking competition show on Food Network. Ganeshram has appeared on Food Network on the show Throwdown! with Bobby Flay and has made appearances on CNNfn, Good Day New York, and other news and lifestyle shows for both radio and television.

Work as a nonprofit director and novelist
Since 2018, Ganeshram has been the executive director of Westport Museum for History & Culture (formerly Westport Historical Society) in Westport, Connecticut, where she has emphasized an inclusive history, representative of people of color, immigrants, women and the LGBTQ community. In 2018-19 she curated the exhibit "Remembered: The History of African Americans" in Westport, that largely revealed the history of enslavement and racial injustice toward African Americans in the Fairfield County, Connecticut town. Artifacts in the exhibit include "shackles and a reconstructed crawl space where two girls, household slaves, might have slept." The exhibit gained the museum awards from the Connecticut League of History Organizations; American Association for State & Local History, and the New England Museum Association.

In 2018, Ganeshram published The General's Cook: A Novel, (Skyhorse, NY) about Hercules Posey, the African-American chef enslaved by George & Martha Washington who self-emancipated in 1797. In early 2019, as reported by Craig LaBan of the Philadelphia Inquirer in March 2019, Ganeshram and her Westport Historical Society colleague Sara Krasne uncovered compelling evidence suggesting Hercules, who had never been seen again after 1801, in fact lived in New York City where he died on May 15, 1812. The discovery offered never-before seen scholarship on Hercules—including his surname—that earned Ganeshram and the Museum praise from historians at Mount Vernon and the writer/historian Professor Erica Armstrong Dunbar whose work also focused on Oney Judge, also enslaved by the Washington family.

See also

List of people from Westport, Connecticut

References

1968 births
American chefs
American children's writers
American people of Iranian descent
American people of Trinidad and Tobago descent
American people of Indian descent
American women journalists
Columbia University Graduate School of Journalism alumni
Living people
Writers from New York City
American women children's writers
American cookbook writers
Women cookbook writers
21st-century American writers
21st-century American women writers